The lieutenant governor of Ontario (in French: Lieutenant-gouverneur (if male) or Lieutenante-gouverneure (if female) de l'Ontario) is the viceregal representative in Ontario of the , who operates distinctly within the province but is also shared equally with the ten other jurisdictions of Canada, as well as the other Commonwealth realms and any subdivisions thereof, and resides predominantly in  oldest realm, the United Kingdom. The lieutenant governor of Ontario is appointed in the same manner as the other provincial viceroys in Canada and is similarly tasked with carrying out most of the monarch's constitutional and ceremonial duties. The current Lieutenant Governor of Ontario is Elizabeth Dowdeswell.

Role and presence 

The lieutenant governor of Ontario is vested with a number of governmental duties and is also expected to undertake various ceremonial roles. For instance, the lieutenant governor acts as patron of certain Ontario institutions, such as the Royal Ontario Museum. Also, the viceroy, him- or herself a member and Chancellor of the order, will induct deserving individuals into the Order of Ontario, and upon installation customarily becomes a Knight or Dame of Justice and the Vice-Prior in Ontario of the Most Venerable Order of the Hospital of Saint John of Jerusalem. The viceroy further presents the Royal Canadian Humane Association medal, the Lincoln M. Alexander Award, the Ontario Volunteer Service Award, the Outstanding Achievement Award for Voluntarism in Ontario, the Ontario Medal for Young Volunteers, and numerous other provincial honours and decorations, as well as various awards that are named for and presented by the lieutenant governor; these are generally created in partnership with another government or charitable organization and linked specifically to their cause. These honours are presented at official ceremonies, which count amongst hundreds of other engagements the lieutenant governor partakes in each year, either as host or guest of honour: In the 18 months following September 23, 2014, Lieutenant Governor Elizabeth Dowdeswell conducted 1066 engagements, equivalent to 711 per year.

At these events, the lieutenant governor's presence may be marked by the post's official flag, consisting of a blue field bearing the escutcheon of the Arms of  Majesty in Right of Ontario surmounted by a crown and surrounded by ten gold maple leaves, symbolizing the ten provinces of Canada. Within Ontario, the lieutenant governor also follows only the sovereign in the province's order of precedence, preceding even other members of the Canadian Royal Family and the King's federal representative.

Since 2011, the incumbent lieutenant governor has served ex officio as the Colonel of the Regiment of the Queen's York Rangers, a unit in the Canadian Army. The honorary appointment recognizes the regiment's links to John Graves Simcoe, the first lieutenant governor of Upper Canada and the regiment's commander during the American War of Independence.

History 

The lieutenant governor of Ontario came into being in 1867, upon the creation of Ontario at Confederation, and evolved from the earlier position of lieutenant governor of Canada West. Since that date, 29 lieutenant governors have served the province, among whom were notable firsts, such as Pauline Mills McGibbon—the first female lieutenant governor of the province—and Lincoln Alexander—the first lieutenant governor of West Indian ancestry. The shortest mandate by a lieutenant governor of Ontario was Henry William Stisted, from 1 July 1867 to 14 July 1868, while the longest was Albert Edward Matthews, from November 1937 to December 1946.

With the election in 1937 of the Liberal Party to a majority in the Legislative Assembly, the lieutenant governor in Ontario was targeted for spending cutbacks. Government House was closed and the viceroy given a suite at the Legislative Building as a replacement. The post then remained relatively low-key until 1985, when the personal discretion of Lieutenant Governor John Black Aird was required in the exercise of the royal prerogative: After Frank Miller that year lost the confidence of the Legislative Assembly, the opposing Liberal Party managed to negotiate a deal with both the New Democratic Party (NDP) and independent members of the assembly and Aird, rather than dissolve the legislature only 55 days after the last election, called upon Liberal leader David Peterson to serve as premier.

See also 
 Government of Ontario
 Great Seal of Ontario
 Lieutenant Governor (Canada)
 Monarchy in the Canadian provinces

References

External links 

 

Ontario